The 2020–21 Melbourne Renegades season was the tenth in the club's history. Coached by Michael Klinger and captained by Aaron Finch, they competed in the BBL's 2020–21 season.

Standings

Fixtures and results

Squad information
The following is the Renegades men squad for the 2020–21 Big Bash League season as of 30 January 2021.

Season statistics

Home attendance

References

External links
 Official website of the Melbourne Renegades
 Official website of the Big Bash League

Melbourne Renegades seasons